"Breakin' My Heart (Pretty Brown Eyes)" is a song performed by Mint Condition, issued as the second single from their debut album Meant to Be Mint. The song was written by band members Jeffrey Allen, Lawrence Waddell and Stokley Williams. Released in 1991, the song is their biggest hit to date, peaking at number six on the Billboard Hot 100 in 1992. The single spent 34 weeks total and 20 weeks in the top 40 on the Hot R&B Singles chart.

Charts

Weekly charts

Year-end charts

References

1991 singles
1991 songs
Mint Condition (band) songs
Perspective Records singles
Contemporary R&B ballads
Soul ballads
1990s ballads